Fredy Mbuna (born 6 March 1982) is a retired Tanzanian footballer.

Club career
Mbuna spent most of his career playing for Young Africans S.C., but had a loan deal to Moro United F.C., made permanent in 2011. For the 2013–14 season, he signed for Maji Maji FC.

International career
Mbuna appeared for the Tanzania national football team in a FIFA World Cup qualifying match.

References

1982 births
Living people
Tanzanian footballers
Tanzania international footballers
Young Africans S.C. players
Moro United F.C. players
Maji Maji F.C. players
Association football defenders
Tanzanian Premier League players